Vices is the debut album by Canadian heavy metal band, Kick Axe. The album was released in 1984 in the format of vinyl and cassette album on producer Spencer Proffer's label Pasha Records and distributed by CBS.

The album was remastered and reissued, first time on CD, in 2000 as part of the "Sony Rewind" series.

In 2016, a UK label Rock Candy remastered and reissued the album on CD in a "De Luxe" version comprising a comprehensive booklet (loaded with vintage photos and a very detailed band history by Malcolm Dome) and a bonus track "30 Days in the Hole", which was originally placed on chromium dioxide cassette versions only of Vices album and on the Up the Creek movie soundtrack.

The album was produced by Spencer Proffer, who was notable for producing Quiet Riot's multi-million selling 1983 album Metal Health. A music video was produced for the track "On the Road to Rock", which received moderate airplay on MuchMusic's weekly heavy metal showcase program the Pepsi Power Hour. The album contains a sterling selection of tracks that place the band center stage in the burgeoning mid-80s hard rock renaissance, and give vocalist George Criston room to impress at every turn. Kick Axe and producer Spencer Proffer skillfully blended here hard rock melodies with straight up metal riffs, attitude, and loads of money spent in the studio. The band had a knack for writing catchy yet hard-hitting anthems, and the musicianship and vocal power to make those anthems really stand out.

In Canada, the album reached #66, September 15, 1984.

The album's best Billboard 200 album chart position was #126  reached on 8 September 1984.

Track listing 
"Heavy Metal Shuffle" (Kick Axe) - 3:15
"Vices" (Kick Axe/Spencer Proffer) - 4:22
"Stay on Top" (Kick Axe) - 4:06
"Dreamin' About You" (Kick Axe) - 4:32
"Maneater" (Kick Axe) - 3:21
"30 Days in the Hole" (Steve Mariott) - 3:52 (cassette version only)
"On the Road to Rock" (Kick Axe) - 4:22
"Cause for Alarm" (Kick Axe) - 4:38
"Alive & Kickin'" (Kick Axe) - 3:50
"All the Right Moves" (Kick Axe) - 4:36
"Just Passing Through" (Kick Axe/Spencer Proffer) - 4:48

Personnel 
George Criston - lead vocals
Larry Gillstrom - lead and rhythm guitars, backing vocals
Raymond Harvey - lead and rhythm guitars, backing vocals
Victor Langen - bass guitar, backing vocals
Brian Gillstrom - drums, backing vocals

Production 
Spencer Proffer - producer
Amy Laura Kellinger - producer assistant
Duane Baron, Spencer Proffer, Hanspeter Huber - engineers
George Marino - mastering
Dario Campanile - cover art
Sam Emerson - photographs
Margo Nahas - logo illustration
Jay Vigon - logo design
Jay Vigon, Spencer Proffer - art direction & design
Terry DiMonte - artist development
Dave Dick - early direction
Gail Lee, Karen Chamberlain, Paula Garcia - administrative assistants
Carol Peters, Lyn Corey-Benson - coordination
Garry M. Stratychuk - manager
Dean Zurowski, Dwayne Fynn, David McCann - tour personnel

References

External links 
 
Official Fan website

1984 debut albums
Kick Axe albums
Pasha Records albums
Albums produced by Spencer Proffer